The women's coxless four event at the 2020 Summer Olympics took place from 24 to 28 July 2021 at the Sea Forest Waterway. 40 rowers from 10 nations competed.

Background
This was the 2nd appearance of the women's coxless four, with the event last previously held at the 1992 Summer Olympics.

The reigning Olympic medalists in the event were Canada, the United States, and Germany. Canada and the United States qualified for the event, whereas Germany did not qualify.

The reigning 2019 World Championship medalists were Australia, the Netherlands, and Denmark.

Qualification

Each National Olympic Committee (NOC) has been limited to a single boat in the event since 1912. There are 10 qualifying places in the women's coxless four:

 8 from the 2019 World Championship
 2 from the final qualification regatta

Competition format
During the first round two heats were held. The first two boats in each heat advanced to final A, while all others were relegated to the repechage.

The repechage is a round which offers rowers a second chance to qualify for Final A. The top two boats in the repechage moved on to the semifinals, with the remaining boats being sent to Final B.

There were two finals. Final A determined the medalists and the places through 6th. Final B determines places seven through ten.

Schedule
The competition was held over five days.

All times are Japan Standard Time (UTC+9)

Rowers per team

Results

Heats
The first two of each heat qualified for the final, while the remainder went to the repechage.

Heat 1

Heat 2

Repechage
The first two in repechage heat qualify for Final A and rest go to Final B.

Final

Final A

Final B

References

Women's coxless four
Women's events at the 2020 Summer Olympics